German submarine U-865 was a Type IXC/40 U-boat of Nazi Germany's Kriegsmarine built for service during the Second World War. She was laid down in Bremen, Germany on 5 January 1943, and launched on 12 July 1943.

Design
German Type IXC/40 submarines were slightly larger than the original Type IXCs. U-865 had a displacement of  when at the surface and  while submerged. She had two shafts and two  propellers.

U-865 was fitted with six  torpedo tubes (four fitted at the bow and two at the stern), 22 torpedoes, one  SK C/32 naval gun, 180 rounds, and a  Flak M42 as well as two twin  C/30 anti-aircraft guns. The boat had a complement of forty-eight.

Service history
She had one commander, Oberleutnant zur See Dietrich Stellmacher, for her two patrols. She had a crew complement of 59.

She did not sink any shipping on her two patrols, and went missing after leaving Trondheim in Norway on 9 September 1944, with all hands lost.

In late June/ early July 1944, she was attacked by an RAF B-24 Liberator, which did some damage to her, however she in turn did some damage to the attacking aircraft with the submarine's flak gun, setting the aircraft on fire. Both the U-boat and aircraft were forced to return to their respective bases.

References

Bibliography

External links

German Type IX submarines
U-boats commissioned in 1943
1943 ships
World War II submarines of Germany
Ships built in Bremen (state)
U-boats sunk in 1944
Missing U-boats of World War II
U-boats sunk by unknown causes
Maritime incidents in September 1944